Turbinoliidae is a family of reef building stony corals.

Genera
 Alatotrochus Cairns, 1994
 Australocyathus Cairns & Parker, 1992
 †Blagrovia Duncan, 1880 
 Conocyathus d'Orbigny, 1849
 Cryptotrochus Cairns, 1988
 Cyathotrochus Bourne, 1905
 Deltocyathoides Yabe & Eguchi, 1932
 Dunocyathus Tenison-Woods, 1878
 Endocyathopora Cairns, 1989
 Foveolocyathus Cairns, 1997
 Holcotrochus Dennant, 1902
 Idiotrochus Wells, 1935
 Kionotrochus Dennant, 1906
 Lissotrochus Cairns, 2004
 Notocyathus Tenison-Woods, 1880
 Peponocyathus Gravier, 1915
 Platytrochus Milne Edwards & Haime, 1848
 Pleotrochus Cairns, 1997
 †Pleuropodia Dennant, 1903
 Pseudocyathoceras Cairns, 1991
 Sphenotrochus Milne Edwards & Haime, 1848
 Thrypticotrochus Cairns, 1989
 Trematotrochus Tenison-Woods, 1879
 Tropidocyathus Milne Edwards & Haime, 1848
 Turbinolia Lamarck, 1816

References

 
Scleractinia
Cnidarian families
Taxa named by Henri Milne-Edwards
Taxa named by Jules Haime